Sad Songs for Dirty Lovers is the second studio album by indie rock band the National. It was released in 2003 on Brassland Records. This is the first album on which the band worked with Peter Katis, who would produce the band's next albums Alligator and Boxer.

The album is the first to feature guitarist and multi-instrumentalist Bryce Dessner (the twin brother of Aaron Dessner) as a full member.

Reception

The album received very positive reviews from music critics, earning a Metacritic aggregate score of 78 based on 13 reviews, indicating 'generally positive reviews'.

As of 2010 the album has sold an approximate 27,000 copies in the US.

Track listing

Personnel
The National
Matt Berninger
Aaron Dessner
Bryce Dessner
Bryan Devendorf
Scott Devendorf

Additional musicians
 Padma Newsome – viola, violin
 Nick Lloyd – piano, keyboards
 Luke Hughett – vocals 
 Nate Martinez – guitar 
 Steve LoPresti – French horn, mellophone 

Technical personnel
 Nick Lloyd – production, additional recording
 Paul Heck – co-production, production 
 Peter Katis – co-production, production , recording , engineering , mixing
 Hugh Pool – basic track recording
 Dan Long – additional recording
 John Loder – mastering
 Padma Newsome – orchestration
 Distant Station – design

Weekly charts

References

2003 albums
The National (band) albums
Albums produced by Peter Katis
Brassland Records albums